John Robins may refer to:
John Robins (born c. 1511), MP for Dover
John Robins (prophet), English Ranter and plebeian prophet
John Robins (c. 1714 – 1754), MP for Stafford
John Robins (rugby union) (1926–2007), Welsh rugby union international
John Robins (comedian) (born 1982), English stand-up comedian
John Robins (writer), (1884–1952), Canadian academic and humorist

See also
 John Robbins (disambiguation)